Apollos University, headquartered in Great Falls, Montana, is an accredited, American, privately-owned distance education university. The university offers Doctoral, Master's, Bachelor's and Associate's degree programs in Business Administration, Management and Information Technology. Apollos University is an academic institution of higher learning and is accredited by the Distance Education Accreditation Commission (DEAC) in the United States. Apollos University is also a member of SARA  (State Authorization and Reciprocity Agreement) and approved to teach students in all 50 U.S. states and the District of Columbia.

Apollos University's programs are offered worldwide through an online, distance learning methodology. The university has students throughout the United States and Canada, as well as in Africa, Asia, Europe, and the Middle East. The university’s programs are built on a foundation of knowledge transfer, application of knowledge, critical thinking, and research skills.

History 
The university was founded in August 2004 as a non-profit university. However, it closed the non-profit corporation and reopened as a for-profit corporation in May, 2005. The new corporation was named Apollos University of California with a "doing business as" name of Apollos University. Formerly headquartered in Huntington Beach, California, Apollos University moved to Great Falls, Montana, on September 30, 2016. and is incorporated and approved as a private institution by the State of Montana.

Apollos University received its approval from the California Bureau for Private Postsecondary and Vocational Education (BPPVE) in July 2005 and enrolled its first student in September 2005. The university held its first graduation ceremony in July 2007. Apollos applied for accreditation in 2010 and received accreditation status in January 2012 from Distance Education and Training Council (DETC) which is now known as the Distance Education Accreditation Commission (DEAC). In 2020, DEAC renewed Apollos University's accreditation.

Accreditation 
Apollos University is an approved as a private institution by the State of Montana and is an accredited member of the Distance Education Accrediting Commission(DEAC) formally the Distance Education and Training Council (DETC). The DEAC is recognized by the U.S. Department of Education (USDE) and the Council for Higher Education Accreditation (CHEA).

Apollos University is listed on the Council for Higher Education Accreditation (CHEA) and listing of accredited universities in United States. Apollos University is also listed on The World Higher Education Database (WHED) and International Association of Universities (IAU) Worldwide Database of Higher Education Institutions, Systems and Credentials.

Academic programs 
Apollos University offers the following accredited certificate and degree programs:

 Certificate Programs in Various Business Professions, 
 Associate of Applied Science in Business Administration (AAS),
 Bachelor of Science in Business Administration (BSBA),
 Bachelor of Science in Information Technology (BSIT),
 Master of Business Administration (MBA),
 Master of Science in Organizational Management (MSOM), and
 Doctor of Business Administration (DBA),

References

External links
 Apollos University official website
 Apollos University information technology department

List of colleges and universities in Montana

For-profit universities and colleges in the United States
2004 establishments in Montana
Distance Education Accreditation Commission